Kristina Ališauskaitė (born 1984) is  Lithuanian painter.

Biography 
She grew up in Klaipėda, later studied painting in Vilnius Academy of Arts. She actively participates in group exhibitions as well as holds solo shows in Lithuania and abroad.

Awards 
 2016 Arte Laguna Prize 2016 - the finalist, Venice, Italy
 2014 100 painters of tomorrow - the finalist. The book of 100 most promising living painters was released in October 2014 by ‘Thames and Hudson’ 
 2013 International contest Young painters prize’13 – Public prize, Vilnius, Lithuania

References 

Lithuanian painters
Vilnius Academy of Arts alumni
Living people
1984 births